USS K-8 (SS-39) was a K-class submarine of the United States Navy.  Her keel was laid down by the Union Iron Works in San Francisco, California, under subcontract from Electric Boat Company of Groton, Connecticut.  She was launched on 11 July 1914 sponsored by Mrs. John W. Lewis, wife of the first commanding officer, and commissioned on 1 December at Mare Island.

Service history

Returning to Mare Island on 4 June 1915, she sailed 3 October for duty in the Hawaiian Islands, arriving Pearl Harbor on 14 October. Ordered to return to the West Coast on 31 October 1917, she arrived San Pedro, California, on 12 November and proceeded 27 November for patrol duty out of Key West, Florida.

Arriving Key West 8 January 1918, she conducted patrols from Key West to Galveston, Texas, during the remaining months of World War I. Departing Galveston 21 November, she returned to Key West to continue experimental operations along the Florida coast until she sailed for Philadelphia, Pennsylvania, on 14 April 1919. Arriving 21 April, K-8 underwent overhaul before sailing 10 November for Key West. Upon arrival 3 December she began seven months of operations in the Caribbean Sea. After returning to Philadelphia 8 June 1920, she proceeded to Annapolis, Maryland, on 19 January 1921, for training operations at the United States Naval Academy. Steaming to Hampton Roads, Virginia, on 15 February, she continued development operations along the Atlantic coast from Norfolk, Virginia, to Cape Cod, returning to Annapolis 4 April through 14 April and visiting the United States Military Academy at West Point, New York, from 24 May through 30 May. She conducted experimental maneuvers in the Chesapeake Bay from 4 December to 16 May 1922; trained students out of New London, Connecticut, from 20 May to 5 September; and returned Hampton Roads 7 September to resume operations in the lower Chesapeake Bay. K-8 decommissioned at Norfolk 24 February 1923. Towed to the Philadelphia Navy Yard on 2 September 1924, she was sold for scrapping on 25 June 1931.

Notes

References

External links
 

United States K-class submarines
World War I submarines of the United States
Ships built in San Francisco
1914 ships
Ships built by Union Iron Works